Reinhard Kienast (born 2 September 1959) is a retired Austrian football player who played 14 seasons for Rapid Wien and 13 times for the Austria national football team.

Hailing from a genuine Rapid Wien family, he is the younger brother of former Rapid Wien player Wolfgang Kienast and uncle of current Austria international Roman Kienast.

Club career 
A versatile player, Kienast played predominantly in midfield for Rapid, but was also employed in defence or in attack. After his 14 seasons at Rapid, he moved to city rivals Favoritner AC. He finished his career with minor sides Süßenbrunn and SG FavAC Simmering. In 1993/1994 he became assistant-coach at Rapid.

He played a major part in the most successful of Rapid teams in the 1980s, claiming the League crown four times and most prominently losing the UEFA Cup Winners Cup Final in 1985 against Everton. He skippered Rapid from 1989 through 1992 and was voted Austria Fan's Footballer of the Year in 1986.

International career
Kienast earned 13 caps for the Nationalmannschaft between 1983 and 1987, scoring 3 goals. In 1986, he scored two of those in a sensational 4–1 defeat of West Germany.

Honours 
 Austrian Football Bundesliga (4):
 1982, 1983, 1987, 1988
 Austrian Cup (4):
 1983, 1984, 1985, 1987

References

External links 
 Player profile – Rapid Wien
  Kienast player stats – Rapid Fanclub
 

1959 births
Living people
Footballers from Vienna
Association football midfielders
Austrian footballers
Austria international footballers
SK Rapid Wien players
Austrian Football Bundesliga players